Arev Baghdasaryan (April 1913 – February 17, 1994) was an Armenian dancer, singer, People's Artist of the Armenian SSR (1961).

Biography 

Arev Baghdasaryan was born in Shusha, Azerbaijan. She graduated from the Azerbaijan State Economic University. In 1936 she won the first place at the Rostov Song and Dance Olympiad. In 1940 she graduated from the Baku Dancing College and got a diploma of solo dancer. During 1937-1941 she performed in the Ensemble of song and dance of the Azerbaijan SSR.

In 1938 in Moscow Arev Baghdasaryan met Avetik Isahakyan who advised her to move to Soviet Armenia. In 1941 she became the soloist of the Armenian State Philharmonic. German-Soviet War, she was involved in the 89th Tamanian Rifle Division.

Since 1946, Arev Baghdasaryan worked in jazz orchestra conducted by founder of the Armenian State Jazz Orchestra Artemi Ayvazyan and had performed in many cities of the Soviet Union and abroad, including Canada, China, Vietnam, Indonesia, Birma (Myanmar), France, Belgium, Luxemburg, India, Nepal, Pakistan, Egypt, Lebanon, etc. In 1981 and 1991 she made a tour in Washington, USA. During 1955–1987 she was the artistic director of "Barekamutyun" Song and dance ensemble. 

One of the popular songs by the artist was "Nakhshun Bajin". Arev Baghdasaryan was buried in "Nakhshun Baji" costume.

Awards
 Honored Artist of the Armenian SSR (1955)
 Order of the Badge of Honour (1956)
 Ho Chi Minh badge (1957)
 People's Artist of the Armenian SSR (1961)
 Jubilee Medal "In Commemoration of the 100th Anniversary of the Birth of Vladimir Ilyich Lenin" (1970)
 Medal "Veteran of Labour" (1983)

Legacy
 In 1983 the name of Arev Baghdasaryan was given to "Barekamutyun" Song and Dance Ensemble.
 Arev Baghdasaryan's memorial plaque can be seen on wall of the 21st building of Abovyan Street in Yerevan (Arev Baghdasaryan lived in that building).
 "A woman from Karabakh" monument (sculptor - David Yerevantsi), which stands on the crossroads of Teryan Street and Sayat-Nova Avenue, was created by the image of Arev Baghdasaryan.

References

External links

Arev Baghdasaryan
RA Ministry of Culture, Arev Baghdasaryan

Further reading
  Egiyan V.  Famous Women of Armenia. - Yerevan, 1971./Егиян В. Передовые женщины Армении. — Ереван, 1971.
  Stepanyan G.  Biographical Dictionary (Figures of Armenian Culture): In 3 volumes. - Yerevan, 1973. - V. 1./Степанян Г. Биографический словарь (Деятели армянской культуры) : В 3-х т. — Ереван, 1973. — Т. 1.
  Araksmanyan A.  Arev Baghdasaryan. - Yerevan, 1973./ Араксманян А. Арев Багдасарян. — Ереван, 1973.

1913 births
1994 deaths
Musicians from Shusha
People from Elizavetpol Governorate
Soviet Armenians
20th-century Armenian women singers
Armenian dancers
People's Artists of Armenia
Soviet dancers